Kudavasal block is a revenue block in the Kudavasal taluk of Tiruvarur district, Tamil Nadu, India.  It has a total of 49 panchayat villages.

References 
 

Revenue blocks of Tiruvarur district